= The King's Cupboard =

Canadian children's television series

- Genre: Children's television
- Country of origin: Canada
- Original language: English
- No. of seasons: 1

Production
- Producer: Paddy Sampson
- Running time: 15 minutes

Original release
- Network: CBC Television
- Release: 20 January – 31 March 1958

The King's Cupboard is a Canadian children's television series that aired on CBC Television in 1958.

== Premise ==
This children's series included puppetry and poetry as presented by characters named Dee Dee, Cuthbert Caterpillar, Jack and King.

== Scheduling ==
This 15-minute series was broadcast Mondays at 5:00 p.m. (Eastern time) from 20 January to 31 March 1958.
